Chrudim is a town in the Pardubice Region of the Czech Republic. It has about 23,000 inhabitants. It is the second largest town of the region. The historic town centre is well preserved and is protected by law as an urban monument zone.

Administrative parts
Chrudim is made up of town parts of Chrudim I–IV and villages of Medlešice, Topol, Vestec and Vlčnov.

Geography

It lies mostly in the Svitavy Uplands. The hill is situated in the southern tip of the municipal territory, which extends into the Iron Mountains and the eponymous protected landscape area.

The Chrudimka River flows through the town.

History

The oldest archeological findings which provide first signs of the settlement in this area date back to the 5th millennium BC. Various cultures succeeded one on another in the territory of today's town of Chrudim and its vicinity. Since the 7th–8th century, the area is inhabited by Slavs.

The first written mention of Chrudim is from 1055, when Duke Bretislav I died here according to Chronica Boemorum. The royal town of Chrudim was founded in 1276 by King Ottokar II of Bohemia for its location on a route from Prague to Moravia. From 1307, it became a dowry town administered by Bohemian Queens.

At the beginning of the Hussite Wars, Chrudim sided with the anti-Catholic side and the German-speaking population left the town. Since then, Chrudim has been an almost exclusively Czech territory by nationality. The town was in opposition to the ruling Habsburgs during the failed Estates Revolt in 1547 and Bohemian Revolt in 1618–1620, which always had serious consequences for it. Chrudim was also severely affected by the Thirty Years' War, during which the evangelical population left as a result of re-Catholicization.

During the 18th and 19th centuries, Chrudim lost partly lost its economical and administrative importance, but it has become important educational and cultural centre, which led to its gain of the nickname "Athens of Eastern Bohemia". In 1871, the railway was built and the town regained economic significance.

Until 1918, the town was part of the Austrian monarchy (Austria side after the compromise of 1867), head of the Chrudim District, one of the 94 Bezirkshauptmannschaften in Bohemia.

Demographics

Economy

There are no major industrial companies in Chrudim. A middle-sized company based in the town is BASF Stavební hmoty Česká republika, part of the BASF conglomerate producing building materials.

Culture
Chrudim is known for the Loutkářská Chrudim Festival. The festival was established in 1951 and is the oldest continuous festival of puppetry in the world.

Sights

The main landmark of Chrudim is the Church of Assumption of the Virgin Mary on the town square. The originally Gothic building was founded before 1349 on the site of a castle. After it was damaged by several fires, it was reconstructed to its current Neo-Gothic form in 1857. Another notable churches with Gothic bases are Church of Saint Catherine, Church of Saint Michael, and Church of the Exaltation of the Holy Cross.

Resselovo Square is the main square of the historic centre. It is lined with preserved burgher houses and includes the originally Renaissance town hall with Baroque façade. In the middle of the square there is the Baroque richly decorated sculptural column of the Transfiguration.

One of the architectural symbols of the town is the Renaissance Mydlářovský House, typical with arcades and oriental-looking triple tower. Today it houses the Museum of Puppetry Culture. A significant sight is also the Neo-Renaissance and Neo-Baroque building of the Regional Museum.

The historic centre was delimited by the town walls. Most of the walls, including several bastions, have been preserved.

Notable people

Bretislav I (1002/1005–1055), Bohemian duke; died here
Viktorin Kornel of Všehrdy (c. 1460–1520), humanist, lawyer and writer
Johann Andreas Kauchlitz Colizzi (c. 1742–1808), musician
Jan Nepomuk Štěpánek (1783–1844), actor and theatre director
Josef Ressel (1793–1857), inventor
Adrienne von Pötting (1856–1909), Austrian painter
Kurt Freund (1914–1996), Czech-Canadian physician and sexologist
Miloslav Výborný (born 1952), politician
Dagmar Pecková (born 1961), operatic mezzo-soprano
Dušan Salfický (born 1972), ice hockey player
Michal Bobek (born 1977), judge
Jiří Magál (born 1977), cross-country skier
Petr Průcha (born 1982), ice hockey player
Jakub Pešek (born 1993), footballer

Twin towns – sister cities

Chrudim is twinned with:
 Motovun, Croatia
 Oleśnica, Poland
 Svidník, Slovakia
 Znojmo, Czech Republic

References

External links

Virtual show

 
Populated places in Chrudim District
Cities and towns in the Czech Republic